"Many Tears Ago" is a song written by Winfield Scott and performed by Connie Francis.  It reached #7 on the U.S. pop chart and #12 on the UK Singles Chart in 1960.

The single's B-side, "Senza Mama (With No One)", reached #87 on the U.S. pop chart.

Other versions
"Big" Tiny Little released a version of the song on his 1961 album "Big" Tiny Little In Person.
Willie Bobo released a version of the song on his 1968 album Spanish Blues Band.
Ray Condo & His Ricochets released a version of the song on their 2000 album High & Wild.
Emmy Rossum released a version of the song on her 2013 album Sentimental Journey.

References

1960 songs
1960 singles
Songs written by Winfield Scott (songwriter)
Connie Francis songs
MGM Records singles